The Prix Iris is a Canadian film award, presented annually by Québec Cinéma, which recognizes talent and achievement in the mainly francophone feature film industry in Quebec. Until 2016, it was known as the Jutra Award (Prix Jutra, with the ceremony called La Soirée des Jutra) in memory of influential Quebec film director Claude Jutra, but Jutra's name was withdrawn from the awards following the publication of Yves Lever's biography of Jutra, which alleged that he had sexually abused children.

It should not be confused with the Claude Jutra Award, a special award presented by the Academy of Canadian Cinema & Television as part of the separate Canadian Screen Awards program which was also renamed in 2016 following the allegations against Jutra.

History
Introduced in 1999, the awards are presented for Best Film and performance, writing and technical categories such as best actor, actress, director, screenplay, et cetera. Due to Quebec's majority francophone population, most films made in the province are French-language films, but English-language films made in the province are also fully eligible for nomination. The awards maintain slightly different eligibility criteria for international coproductions, however: a coproduction which surpasses the organization's criteria for "majority Québécois" involvement is treated the same as a Quebec film, with full eligibility in all categories, while a coproduction which is classified as "minority Québécois", such as the 2015 film Brooklyn, is eligible only in categories where a resident of Quebec is the nominee, and cannot be submitted for Best Film.

The initial creation of the awards sparked some concern that the idea of a separate award for Quebec films would undermine the pan-Canadian scope of the Genie Awards; Québec Cinéma clarified that it did not have, and would not impose, a rule that films could not be submitted for both awards, although at least one film producer, Roger Frappier, voluntarily declined to submit the films August 32nd on Earth (Un 32 août sur terre) and 2 Seconds (2 secondes) for Genie consideration at all on the grounds that since neither film was projected to be popular outside Quebec, they would purportedly not get any public relations or marketing benefit out of Genie nominations. Frappier has not subsequently refused to submit other films to the Genies or the Canadian Screen Awards after 1999.

Following the withdrawal of Jutra's name from the award, the 2016 awards were presented solely under the name Québec Cinéma pending an announcement of the award's new permanent name. The Prix Iris name was announced in October 2016.

The trophy was designed by sculptor Charles Daudelin. The awards replaced the prix Guy-L'Écuyer, created in 1987 by Les Rendez-vous du cinéma québécois in memory of actor Guy L'Écuyer.

The 22nd Quebec Cinema Awards ceremony, originally planned for June 7, 2020, was cancelled due to the COVID-19 pandemic in Canada; unlike the 8th Canadian Screen Awards, however, the award nominations had not yet been released when the cancellation of the ceremony was announced. Nominations were still released on April 22, and the winners were announced via livestreaming on June 10.

Following the death of influential Quebec filmmaker Jean-Marc Vallée in December 2021, there was some public demand that Québec Cinéma rename the awards to the Prix Vallée in his honour.

In 2022, Radio-Canada announced that due to declining ratings in recent years, it would not televise the 2023 awards, and was instead planning alternative ways to highlight Quebec film in its programming. In February 2023, Québec Cinéma indicated that it was in negotiations with other broadcasters to carry the 25th Quebec Cinema Awards, with details of the ceremony and its broadcast pending.

Ceremonies and Best Picture winners

Categories

See also
 Cinema of Quebec
 List of Quebec film directors
 List of Quebec films
 Prix Albert-Tessier, lifetime achievement awards in Quebec cinema given by the Government of Quebec

References

External links
 Gala des Jutra 2010 at Radio-Canada 
  

Lists of award winners
Quebec-related lists
Awards established in 1999

1999 establishments in Canada